The Shadow Girl  is a 2011 novel by Australian author John Larkin. It was awarded the 2012 Victorian Premier's Award for young adult fiction.

References

2011 Australian novels
Australian young adult novels
Random House books